New Violent Breed is a various artists compilation album released on July 21, 1998 by COP International.

Track listing

Personnel
Adapted from the New Violent Breed liner notes.

 Kim Hansen (as Kim X) – compiling
 Louis "Magic" Zachert – mastering
 Nadine – cover art
 Christian Petke (as Count Zero) – compiling, design

Release history

References

External links 
 

1998 compilation albums
COP International compilation albums